William Flavius Lester Hadley (June 15, 1847 – April 25, 1901) was a U.S. Representative from Illinois.

Born near Collinsville, Illinois, Hadley attended the common schools. He was graduated from McKendree College, Lebanon, Illinois, in June 1867, and from the law department of the University of Michigan at Ann Arbor in 1871. He was admitted to the bar in 1871 and commenced practice at Edwardsville, Illinois. He served as member of the State senate in 1886. He served as delegate to the Republican National Convention in 1888.

Hadley was elected as a Republican to the Fifty-fourth Congress to fill the vacancy caused by the death of Frederick Remann and served from December 2, 1895, to March 3, 1897. He was an unsuccessful candidate for reelection in 1896. He engaged in banking. He died in Riverside, California, April 25, 1901. He was interred in Woodlawn Cemetery, Edwardsville, Illinois.

References

1847 births
1901 deaths
People from Collinsville, Illinois
McKendree University alumni
University of Michigan Law School alumni
Republican Party members of the United States House of Representatives from Illinois
Republican Party Illinois state senators
19th-century American politicians
People from Edwardsville, Illinois